The England cricket team toured South Africa for a four-match Test series, a five-match One Day International (ODI) series and two Twenty20 Internationals between 6 November 2009 and 18 January 2010. The tour was balanced throughout, with both the Twenty20 International and Test series being drawn, and England narrowly winning the ODI series 2–1.

By levelling the Test series with victory in the final Test, South Africa retained the Basil D'Oliveira Trophy they had earnt in England in 2008. Despite the decision made in 2008 to grant Test series between South Africa and England "icon" status, and thus comprise five Test matches and only three ODI matches, the tour retained the previous balance of four Tests and five ODIs.

A quiet, friendly series erupted with controversy in the third and fourth Tests of the series. On the third day of the third Test, television images showed Stuart Broad standing on the ball, and fellow England pace-bowler James Anderson picking at the leather of the ball, causing South Africa to raise concerns about the condition of the ball, and the actions of the England duo. After some delay, the South African team announced that they were not making an official complaint to the International Cricket Council (ICC), who in turn confirmed that the matter was closed. In the fourth Test, after an apparent nick by Graeme Smith was taken by wicket-keeper Matt Prior, the umpire Tony Hill turned down the appeal, and third umpire Daryl Harper upheld Hill's decision on review. However, TV replays showed an audible noise as the ball passed the bat. England announced that they would lodge an official complaint with the ICC, with the England and Wales Cricket Board (ECB) asking for the review to be reinstated. The ICC defended Harper, but said that it would launch a "full and comprehensive investigation" into the incident after the match.

Squads

T20I series

1st T20I

2nd T20I

ODI series

1st ODI

2nd ODI

3rd ODI

4th ODI

5th ODI

Test series

1st Test

2nd Test

3rd Test

4th Test

Tour matches

50-over: England XI v Diamond Eagles

50-over: England XI v Chevrolet Warriors

20-over: England XI v South Africa A

50-over: England XI v South Africa A

2-day: England XI v South African Airways Challenge XI

Media coverage
Television
Supersport – South Africa
Sky Sports – United Kingdom and Ireland
Ten Sports – India, Pakistan, Sri Lanka and Bangladesh
Sky Sport – New Zealand
Fox Sports – Australia

References

2009 in English cricket
2009–10 South African cricket season
2010 in English cricket
2009-10
International cricket competitions in 2009–10